Irene Escolar Navarro (born 19 October 1988) is a Spanish cinema, theatre, and television actress.

Escolar received a Goya Award for Best New Actress in 2016, and an Irizar Award at the San Sebastián International Film Festival for her critically acclaimed role of June in An Autumn Without Berlin. Escolar is fluent in Spanish, English, and French. Her professional life includes 17 films and 25 theatre plays. She is also well known for her theatre career. In 2019 she was picked to play the leading role in Movistar +'s first international series, Dime Quién Soy. The world premiere of the show was in 2020. Escolar is the creator and executive producer, alongside Bárbara Lennie, of Escenario 0 for HBO Europe.

Filmography

Film

Television

References

External links

1988 births
Spanish television actresses
Spanish film actresses
Actresses from Madrid
Living people
21st-century Spanish actresses
Spanish stage actresses